Cape Falcon may refer to:

 Cape Falcon in Algeria
 Cape Falcon in Oregon, USA
 Cape Falcon Marine Reserve in Oregon, USA